Louis-Callixte Lasserre was a French Bishop and Missionary who served in the Middle East and Africa.

Life 
Louis was born in Morestel on 6 April 1839; at the age of 23, he joined the seminary on 22 August 1862 and was ordained a priest of the Order of Friars Minor Capuchins. On 15 March 1881, Pope Leo XIII appointed him as Titular Bishop of Marocco o Marruecos and Coadjutor Vicar Apostolic of Galla; he was consecrated on 10 December 1882 by The Vicar Apostolic of Galla, Bishop Louis-Taurin Cahagne, O.F.M. Cap.

Msgr. Louis was supposed to succeed as the Vicar Apostolic of Galla. However, Pope Leo XIII appointed him as Prefect of Arabia in 1886, then as Vicar Apostolic of Aden on 25 April 1888. The Apostolic Vicariate of Aden was renamed, restructured, and redrawn as The Apostolic Vicariate of Arabia and Msgr. Louis was named Vicar Apostolic of Arabia. In April 1900, he resigned from the Vicariate at 60 and died three years later on 22 August 1903.

References 

 

|-
 

|-
 

1839 births
1903 deaths
Roman Catholic bishops in the Middle East
Catholic missionaries in Arabia
Apostolic Vicariate of Arabia
Catholic Church in the Arabian Peninsula